The ICA IS-32 is an open class high-performance metal two-seat sailplane produced in Romania in the 1970s. A refinement of the IS-28B, it shared most of that aircraft's fuselage, mated to new wings and empennage. This new wing had a span of 20 metres, featuring interconnected ailerons and flaps, Schempp-Hirth-type airbrakes. It had no provision for water ballast. The monowheel undercarriage differed from the IS-28 in being fully retractable.

Specifications

References

Further reading
 
 
 

1970s Romanian sailplanes
ICA aircraft
Aircraft first flown in 1977
Shoulder-wing aircraft
Forward-swept-wing aircraft
T-tail aircraft